Anupriya Patel (born 28 April 1981) is an Indian politician from the state of Uttar Pradesh belonging to the Apna Dal (Sonelal) party currently serving as the Minister of State for Commerce and Industry of India since 7 July 2021. She represents Mirzapur in Lok Sabha since 2014. She was the Minister of State in the Ministry of Health and Family Welfare, Government of India, from 2016 to 2019.

She was elected to the Lok Sabha, the lower house of the Parliament of India from the constituency of Mirzapur in the 2014 Indian general election, and again in 2019. She was previously elected as a Member of the Legislative Assembly for the Rohaniya constituency of the Legislature of Uttar Pradesh in Varanasi, where she had fought a campaign in alliance with the Peace Party of India and Bundelkhand Congress in the 2012 Uttar Pradesh legislative assembly election.

Life
Anupriya Patel is the daughter of Sone Lal Patel, who founded the Apna Dal (Sonelal) political party that is based in Uttar Pradesh. She was educated at Lady Shri Ram College for Women and Chhatrapati Shahu Ji Maharaj University, formerly Kanpur University. She has a master's degrees in Psychology and also Masters in Business Administration (MBA), and has taught at Amity.

Career
Patel has been president of Apna Dal since the death of her father in October 2009. In 2012, she was elected as the member of Uttar Pradesh Legislative Assembly election, for the Rohaniya constituency in Varanasi.

In the 2014 general election, Patel's party campaigned in alliance with the Bharatiya Janata Party, led by Narendra Modi. She was elected as Member of Parliament from Mirzapur constituency. After the election, there were rumours that the two parties would merge but Patel rejected overtures intended to result in that.

Family

Krishna Patel
Krishna Patel is the mother of union minister and Apna Dal (S) president Anupriya Patel. Krishna Patel became the party president of Apna Dal (Kamerawadi) after Dr. Sone Lal Patel, founder of Apna Dal, died. Krishna Patel contested unsuccessfully from Pratapgarh Sadar assembly constituency Uttar Pradesh, seat for the 2022 election as Samajwadi Party alliance candidate. Dr pallavi patel is the sister of anupriya patel recenty pallavi patel came in news Head line after defeating Deputy cm keshav prasad maurya in sirathu vidhan sabha

References

External links

Lok Sabha biography

1981 births
Living people
India MPs 2019–present
Lok Sabha members from Uttar Pradesh
Apna Dal politicians
People from Varanasi district
Women in Uttar Pradesh politics
People from Kanpur
People from Mirzapur
Narendra Modi ministry
Indian Hindus
21st-century Indian women politicians
21st-century Indian politicians
Apna Dal (Sonelal) politicians
Women union ministers of state of India
Women members of the Lok Sabha
Uttar Pradesh MLAs 2012–2017